Mała Gunica is a river of Poland, a tributary of the Gunica near Węgornik.

Rivers of Poland
Rivers of West Pomeranian Voivodeship